Gismonda (minor planet designation: 492 Gismonda) is a Themistian asteroid discovered by Max Wolf. Gismonda is named after the daughter of Tancred, prince of Salerno, from Giovanni Boccaccio's work, The Decameron.

References

External links 
 Lightcurve plot of (492) Gismonda, Antelope Hills Observatory
 
 

000492
Discoveries by Max Wolf
Named minor planets
19020903